Kellie Louise Lucas (born 31 March 1978) is an Australian badminton player. She competed at the 2000 Summer Olympics in the women's singles, doubles, and mixed doubles event. She participated at the three consecutive Commonwealth Games in 1998, 2002, and 2006, and winning a women's team bronze medal in 1998. Lucas was crowned Ballarat's Sportswoman of the Year for the fourth time in her sporting career.

Achievements

Oceania Championships
Women's singles

Women's doubles

Mixed doubles

IBF Grand Prix 
The World Badminton Grand Prix sanctioned by International Badminton Federation (IBF) since 1983.

Women's doubles

IBF International
Women's singles

Women's doubles

Mixed doubles

References

External links
 
 

1978 births
Living people
Sportspeople from Ballarat
Australian female badminton players
Olympic badminton players of Australia
Badminton players at the 2000 Summer Olympics
Badminton players at the 2006 Commonwealth Games
Badminton players at the 2002 Commonwealth Games
Badminton players at the 1998 Commonwealth Games
Commonwealth Games medallists in badminton
Commonwealth Games bronze medallists for Australia
Medallists at the 1998 Commonwealth Games